Janie Jones is a 2010 American drama film written and directed by David M. Rosenthal. It stars Abigail Breslin as the title character, as well as Alessandro Nivola, Elisabeth Shue, Brittany Snow, and Peter Stormare. The story is about a fading, alcoholic rock star meeting his daughter for the first time after being left by her drugged-up mother, and the growing relationship they have while on tour. Rosenthal based the film's storyline on his real-life meeting with his own daughter.

The film makes extensive use of original music created by Gemma Hayes and Eef Barzelay, and is performed by Breslin and Nivola. It was shot in Des Moines in September 2009. It premiered at the 2010 Toronto International Film Festival on September 17, 2010, got picked up by Tribeca Film to show at their festival on April 29, 2011, and was given a limited release on October 28. Janie Jones received mixed reviews from critics who gave praise to the two main leads but found Rosenthal's storytelling and direction lacking in terms of originality and tonal pacing.

Plot

A 13-year-old girl is abandoned by her meth-addicted former-groupie mother, after she informs Ethan Brand, an alcoholic, on-the-road, fading rock star, that Janie is his daughter, and he is not happy about it.

Cast
Abigail Breslin as Janie Jones
Alessandro Nivola as Ethan Brand
Elisabeth Shue as Mary Ann Jones
Brittany Snow as Iris
Peter Stormare as Sloan
Joel David Moore as Dave
Frances Fisher as Lily Brand
Frank Whaley as Chuck
Rodney Eastman as Billy

Production
David M. Rosenthal was inspired to make Janie Jones based on the experience he had meeting his daughter for the first time when she was eleven and he was thirty. Abigail Breslin got the script while filming Zombieland and was interested in the story and its title character, adding that the musical aspect was initially "nerve-wracking" when it came to professionally singing and playing guitar, but soon came to like it. Alessandro Nivola was given the script after shooting Coco Before Chanel in France for four months, and found it a great departure from the previous film he worked on due to the music grabbing his interest. Filming began in September 2009 at Des Moines, Iowa.

Soundtrack

The film's soundtrack was released on October 11, 2011 featuring songs written by Irish singer-songwriter Gemma Hayes and Israeli-born American Eef Barzelay. The songs on the album are performed by Abigail Breslin, Alessandro Nivola, Patrick Watson, William Fitzsimmons and Gemma Hayes.

Release
Janie Jones premiered at the Toronto International Film Festival on September 17, 2010. It was acquired by Tribeca Film after its premiere at TIFF and was screened at their festival on April 29, 2011. It was originally given a Summer 2011 theatrical release, as well as on video-on-demand and other platforms, but had a free screening on October 11 and was given a limited release on October 28. During its weekly run, the film grossed $3,297 from two theatres, averaging $1,648 per theater, and ranking number 103 at the box office. It garnered a total gross of $6,480 after 10 weeks of release, with a widest release of two theatres. The film was released on DVD on January 31, 2012.

Reception
Janie Jones garnered mixed reviews from critics. Metacritic gave the film a score of 52 out of 100, based on 16 critics, indicating "mixed or average reviews".

Noel Murray of The A.V. Club gave the film a B− grade. Despite the tonal dissonance in Rosenthal's direction of his own script, he called it "one of the more realistic depictions of what the rock 'n' roll lifestyle is really like", adding that the songs written by both Barzelay and Hayes make the concert scenes "look and sound like actual alt-rock shows." Eric Kohn of IndieWire commended Rosenthal for being able to sidestep formulaic contrivances with filmmaker's restraint and trusting his two main leads to give their characters subtly, saying that "[A]lthough not exemplary, Janie Jones at least manages to give its tired scenario a sense of legitimacy." Kenji Fujishima of Slant Magazine said that viewers will be able to get through the film's "panoply of clichés" and "defiantly generic, low-stakes terms" because of Nivola and Breslin's respective character portrayals, concluding that "even if Rosenthal's film is almost astoundingly unambitious, at least it's generous and warmhearted enough to be reasonably inoffensive. Oh, and the songs aren't too bad, either: bland but pleasant, much like the film itself."

Ray Bennett of The Hollywood Reporter wrote that: "The film's original songs are low key, the storytelling lacks any kind of vivid insights into life on the road that have not been seen before and the outcome is signposted clearly. The production is more a promise of what the filmmaker and performers might have to offer in the future that anything likely to make a mark with audiences." Tom Russo of The Boston Globe felt that Rosenthal's filmmaking didn't deliver any "sharply defined" scenes close to the opener and caused some "distractingly erratic" characterizations for his two leads due to tonal pacing, concluding that the film "would feel more assured if Rosenthal had shown more inclination to commit."

Breslin and Nivola both received praise for their performances. The Washington Posts Ann Hornaday called them "a terrific mismatched pair" that can "harmonize not only figuratively but literally." Ian Buckwalter of NPR felt that the focus shift to its two main leads in the second half improves the film slightly, saying that "Breslin remains as charismatic and instantly likable as she was in her Oscar-nominated role in Little Miss Sunshine, and the often under-the-radar Nivola shows the makings of a star." He added that the film carries a "lightweight sweetness" due to the chemistry between them. Bennett commended Nivola for having "the grizzled charm and arrogance of a rock star" but said the film's appeal rests on Breslin who displays "spirit and singing ability" in her role, saying that she gets "a sturdy peg for her ongoing growth as a film actor. While it's not likely to be a highlight in her career, it's no shame either." Russo also praised both actors' performances, saying that Nivola does "a convincingly edgy downward spiral" done by his character and Breslin portrays the title role like "a kid believably rolling with adults' bad behavior because she doesn't know how else to respond."

In a review for the Los Angeles Times, Robert Abele said that Nivola "does a serviceable job conveying a certain kind of brittle, hotheaded flameout with remnants of musical soulfulness worth reviving" but felt that Breslin wasn't given much opposite him in a role that "should feel like more of a title character than a programmatic catalyst for his redemptive change." Kyle Smith of the New York Post said that the two central characters "spend most of the movie performing forgettable songs, and the inevitable bonding and redemption scenes contain all the excitement of an evening spent deleting spam."

Frances Fisher was nominated for Best Supporting Actress by the Chlotrudis Society for Independent Films for her work in the film, but ultimately lost to Lesley Manville for Another Year.

References

External links
 
 
 
 
 

2010 films
2010 drama films
2010 independent films
2010s American films
2010s English-language films
2010s musical drama films
American drama films
American independent films
American musical drama films
Films about alcoholism
Films about dysfunctional families
Films about music and musicians
Films directed by David M. Rosenthal
Films shot in Iowa